Yelyzaveta Hilyazetdinova (born 15 August 1994) is a Ukrainian handball player for SC Galytchanka Lviv and the Ukrainian national team.

References

1994 births
Living people
Ukrainian female handball players
People from Kamianets-Podilskyi
Ukrainian expatriate sportspeople in Azerbaijan
Sportspeople from Khmelnytskyi Oblast
21st-century Ukrainian women